Land is the fourth full-length album by the Faroese Viking / folk metal band Týr. It is a multilingual album with vocals in Faroese, English, Norwegian, Danish in Sinklars Vísa and Icelandic in Brennivín. It was released on 30 May 2008 through Napalm Records. The album is based on Nordic folklore. The final track is a new version of the song "Hail to the Hammer" which originally appeared on a demo in 2000, and again on How Far To Asgaard in 2002.

Track listing

References

2008 albums
Týr (band) albums
Napalm Records albums